Milot  may refer to:

 Milot, Albania, a municipality in Lezhë County, Albania
 Milot, Haiti, a commune in Nord department, Haiti
 Milot Rashica (born 1996), Kosovo Albanian footballer